Cortinarius smithii is an agaric fungus of the genus Cortinarius. Originally named Cortinarius phoeniceus var. occidentalis by American mycologist Alexander H. Smith in 1939, it was renamed to honor Smith in 2012, after molecular analysis revealed that it was genetically different from Cortinarius phoeniceus. It is found in North America.

See also
List of Cortinarius species

References

External links

smithii
Fungi described in 1939
Fungi of North America